Bholari is a small town in Jamshoro District, Sindh, Pakistan. The coordinates of the town are 25° 19' 0" North, 68° 13' 0" Eas. Its original name (with diacritics) is Bholāri. The town is also connected to the railway network via a railway station, Bholari railway station.

Bholari Air Base 
The Pakistan Air Force's new PAF Base Bholari was inaugurated in January 2018. The base hosts the Number 19 Multirole Squadron equipped with F-16 multirole fighter aircraft.

References

Thatta District